= Chemist in Training =

Canadian professional designation

A Chemist In Training (CIT) is a Canadian designation for someone who has obtained a degree from an accredited institution, that qualifies for registration with one of the provincial or territorial chemical professional associations, but has not yet achieved the additional requirements (like relevant supervised work experience) to become accredited as a Professional Chemist (P.Chem.).

== Licensure ==
A licensed CIT is certified to work in a chemistry profession. Upon completing a certain amount of work experience under the supervision of a Licensed Professional Chemist (P.Chem.) as determined by a licensing board, a CIT is then eligible to gain experience by supervision from a P.Chem.

While being a certified CIT may help in obtaining a chemistry related job, it is not typically required to do chemistry work. All work performed by an CIT must still be checked and certified by a P.Chem.
