= Professional chemist (Canada) =

Professional chemist is the term for registered or licensed chemists in Canada who are permitted to offer their professional services directly to the public. The professional chemist designation is commonly abbreviated to PChem when added as a suffix after a person's name.

The term professional chemist and the actual practice of professional chemistry is legally defined and protected by the government. In some jurisdictions only registered or licensed professional chemists or chartered chemists are permitted to use the title, or to practice professional chemistry.

The earmark that distinguishes a licensed/registered professional chemist is the authority to sign and seal or "stamp" chemistry documents (reports, drawings and calculations) for a study, estimate, design or analysis, thus taking legal responsibility for it.

== Registration and regulation ==
Each province has specific procedures and requirements for license or registration. On March 20, 2017, the Federation of Canada’s Professional Chemists (FCPC) announced that provincial chemists’ organizations have adopted a Memorandum of Understanding to facilitate mobility of professional chemists between provinces which enabled Professional Chemists who are members of organizations established in each province to move and work in other provinces. The licensing procedure varies, but the general process is:

- Graduate with a degree from an accredited university program in chemistry
- Accumulate a certain amount of experience as a Chemist in Training; this can range from two to five years depending on the province
- Complete and pass the essential courses required by the professional organizations

== The chemist title ==
The title chemist is legally protected in some provinces, meaning that is it unlawful to use it to offer chemistry services to the public unless permission is specifically granted by that province through a professional chemist license. With legal documentation, this is commonly referred to as the Right to Title. A licensed professional has the option of wearing a Chemists' Ring.

== Unlicensed practice ==
Since the regulation of the practice of chemistry is performed by the individual provinces in Canada, areas of chemistry which are an exception to mandatory regulatory requirements are:

- A professor teaching chemistry in an accredited program
- Military personnel currently actively licensed with the Canadian government

Chemists are not registered in a specific discipline but are prohibited by the code of ethics from practicing beyond their training and experience. Breaches of the code are often sufficient grounds for enforcement, which may include the suspension or loss of license, as well as financial penalties and now, through recent changes to Canadian law, could also result in jail time should negligence be shown to have played a part in any incident in which there is loss of human life.

Some examples of a professional chemist would be an oilfield chemist, drilling fluids chemist, environmental chemist, biochemist, or pharmacist.
